A Woman's Life is a 2016 French-Belgian drama film directed by Stéphane Brizé. It is based on the Guy de Maupassant's novel Une vie. It was selected to compete for the Golden Lion at the 73rd Venice International Film Festival where it won the FIPRESCI Prize for Best Film in competition. It was awarded the Louis Delluc Prize for Best Film in 2016.

Cast

 Judith Chemla as Jeanne du Perthuis des Vauds
 Jean-Pierre Darroussin as Simon-Jacques Le Perthuis des Vauds
 Yolande Moreau as Adélaïde Le Perthuis des Vauds
 Swann Arlaud as Julien de Lamare
 Nina Meurisse as Rosalie
 Finnegan Oldfield as Paul de Lamare
 Clotilde Hesme as Gilberte de Fourville
 Alain Beigel as Georges de Fourville
 Olivier Perrier as Picot
 François-Xavier Ledoux as Tolbiac
 Lucette Beudin as Ludivine
 Sarah Durand as Françoise
 Marc Olry as Ferdinant de Vauvert
 Lise Lamétrie as Cousin Rose

Production
The film was shot in Normandy. It started 24 August 2015.

Accolades

References

External links
 

2016 drama films
Films based on French novels
Films based on works by Guy de Maupassant
Films directed by Stéphane Brizé
French drama films
Belgian drama films
2010s French-language films
2016 films
Louis Delluc Prize winners
French-language Belgian films
2010s French films